The Southwest Junior College Football Conference (SWJCFC) is a football conference for National Junior College Athletic Association (NJCAA) teams located in the Southwestern United States. The conference has produced 5 of the last 15 NJCAA national champions.

Current members

Former members
Allen Academy (eliminated college programs)
Hillsboro Junior College (closed, reopened as Hill College)
Lon Morris College (closed)
Odessa College (disbanded)
Panola College (disbanded)
Paris Junior College (disbanded)
Ranger College (disbanded)
Southwest Texas Junior College (disbanded)
Texarkana College (disbanded)
Wharton County Junior College (disbanded)

Future member
New Mexico Military Institute has announced it will leave the Western States Football League and join the SWJCFC for the 2016 season.

Champions
Trinity Valley (aka Henderson County) (17 titles, 11 outright):2014, 2005, 1999, 1997, 1994, 1991*, 1988, 1984, 1983, 1973*, 1968*, 1967, 1966*, 1965, 1959, 1958, 1953*, 1952*
Kilgore (15 titles, 11 outright):2018, 2015, 2004, 2001, 1992*, 1990, 1982, 1980, 1978, 1977*, 1975, 1970, 1968*, 1966*, 1946
Tyler (11 titles, 8 outright): 2000, 1993*, 1992*, 1991*, 1986, 1985, 1981, 1979, 1974, 1971, 1969
Navarro (12 titles, 6 outright):2019, 2007, 1993*, 1989, 1977*, 1976, 1973*, 1962*, 1961, 1953*, 1952, 1951
Blinn (6 titles, 6 outright): 2009, 2006, 1996, 1995, 1987, 1972
Northeastern Oklahoma A&M (3 titles, 3 outright): 2003, 2002, 1998
Texarkana (3 titles, 2 outright): 1964, 1957, 1955*
Wharton County (3 titles, 1 outright): 1963, 1962*, 1948*
Panola (2 titles, 2 outright): 1950, 1949
Paris (2 titles, 1 outright): 1955*, 1954
Ranger (2 titles, 1 outright): 1960, 1948*
Allen (1 title, 1 outright): 1956
Hillsboro (now Hills College) (1 title, 0 outright): 1947*
Southwest Texas (1 title, 0 outright): 1947*
"*" denotes shared title

External links
 Southwest Junior College Football Conference

NJCAA conferences
College football-only conferences in the United States